Illusion were a British progressive rock band formed in 1977. They released two albums, Out of the Mist (1977) and Illusion (1978) on Island Records, before folding in 1979.  A third release titled Enchanted Caress (made up of demos for a proposed 3rd album, from the late 1970s) was released in 1990.

Illusion were intended to be a reunion of the original line-up of Renaissance (whose second 1971 album was titled Illusion), but singer and guitarist Keith Relf died before the project was realised. Thereafter, the band's new lineup featured Louis Cennamo on bass, John Hawken on keyboards, Jim McCarty moved from drums to play acoustic guitar and share vocals with Jane Relf, while Eddie McNeill replaced him on drums and John Knightsbridge (from Third World War, and later of Ruthless Blues) played lead guitar.

In 2001, McCarty, Cennamo, Hawken and Jane Relf reunited once again to record Through the Fire, an album of new material, under the bandname Renaissance Illusion.

Members
 Jane Relf – vocals
 Jim McCarty – vocals, acoustic guitar, percussion
 John Knightsbridge – guitars
 John Hawken – keyboards
 Louis Cennamo – bass
 Eddie McNeill – drums

Discography

Out of the Mist (1977)

Personnel
 Jane Relf – vocals
 Jim McCarty – vocals, acoustic guitar, percussion
 John Knightsbridge – electric and acoustic guitar
 John Hawken – piano, synthesizers, Mellotron, Hammond organ, Fender Rhodes electric piano, harpsichord
 Louis Cennamo – bass guitar
 Eddie McNeil – drums, percussion

Notes
"Face of Yesterday" was a remake of a song from Renaissance's Illusion album (1971)

Illusion (1978)

Personnel
 Jane Relf – vocal
 Jim McCarty – vocal, acoustic guitar, percussion
 John Knightsbridge – electric and acoustic guitar
 John Hawken – piano, synthesizers, Mellotron, Hammond organ, Fender Rhodes electric piano, harpsichord
 Louis Cennamo – bass guitar
 Eddie McNeil – drums, percussion

Enchanted Caress (1979)

Personnel
 Jane Relf – vocal, percussion
 Jim McCarty – vocal, acoustic guitar, percussion
 John Knightsbridge – electric and acoustic guitars
 John Hawken – piano, analogue synthesizers (Moog/ARP), Mellotron (original), Hammond organ, Fender Rhodes electric piano, harpsichord
 Louis Cennamo – bass guitar (1–5), (7–10)
 Eddie McNeil – drums, percussion (1–5), (7–10)
 Keith Relf – vocals, acoustic guitar (10) (See Notes below)

Session personnel
 Chas Cronk – bass (6)
 Tony Fernandez – drums (6)

Notes
 Recorded in 1979 but was released as an album in 1990. Contains demos for a planned third album, plus a 1976 Keith Relf demo and a John Knightsbridge solo instrumental.
 "Slaughter on Tenth Avenue" features John Knightsbridge, with Chas Cronk on bass and Tony Fernandez on drums.
 "All the Falling Angels" features Keith Relf, with other musicians including Louis Cennamo on bass. It was Keith's last recording before his death (May 1976).
  See YouTube video (JimMcCarty and Co) for original Home Demo version of "All the Falling Angels".

Through the Fire (2001)

Personnel

 Jane Relf – vocals
 Jim McCarty – lead vocals, drums, percussion
 John Idan – acoustic guitar
 John Hawken – piano, keyboards
 Louis Cennamo – bass
 Ravi – percussion
 Jackie Rawe – vocals

 Mandy Bell – vocals
 Emily Burridge – cello
 Dzal Martin – acoustic guitar
 Gary Le Port – acoustic guitar
 Jonathan Digby – acoustic guitar
 Danny Relf – synthesizer programming
 Ron Korb – vocals, flute

References

External links
 Northern Lights Renaissance website; includes Illusion discography etc.
 John Hawken website
 [ Illusion biography by Bradley Torreano, discography and album reviews, credits & releases] at AllMusic
 Illusion discography, album releases & credits at Discogs
 Illusion albums to be listened as stream on Spotify

Island Records artists
Musical groups established in 1977
English progressive rock groups
Female-fronted musical groups